Crudia is a genus of plants in the family Fabaceae.

Species
Species accepted by the Plants of the World Online as of February 2021:

Crudia abbreviata 
Crudia acuminata 
Crudia acuta 
Crudia aequalis 
Crudia amazonica 
Crudia aromatica 
Crudia balachandrae 
Crudia bantamensis 
Crudia beccarii 
Crudia blancoi 
Crudia bracteata 
Crudia caudata 
Crudia cauliflora 
Crudia chrysantha 
Crudia curtisii 
Crudia cynometroides 
Crudia dewitii 
Crudia evansii 
Crudia gabonensis 
Crudia glaberrima 
Crudia gracilis 
Crudia harmsiana 
Crudia humboldtiana 
Crudia katikii 
Crudia klainei 
Crudia lanceolata 
Crudia laurentii 
Crudia ledermannii 
Crudia letouzeyi 
Crudia liberica 
Crudia mansonii 
Crudia michelsonii 
Crudia mutabilis 
Crudia oblonga 
Crudia orientalis 
Crudia ornata 
Crudia papuana 
Crudia penduliflora 
Crudia pubescens 
Crudia reticulata 
Crudia ripicola 
Crudia scortechinii 
Crudia senegalensis 
Crudia sparei 
Crudia speciosa 
Crudia spicata 
Crudia splendens 
Crudia subsimplicifolia 
Crudia tenuipes 
Crudia teysmannii 
Crudia tomentosa 
Crudia velutina 
Crudia venenosa 
Crudia viridiflora 
Crudia wrayi 
Crudia zenkeri 
Crudia zeylanica

References

 
Fabaceae genera
Taxonomy articles created by Polbot